Rugosus is a genus of beetles in the family Dytiscidae, containing the following species:

 Rugosus emarginatus García, 2001
 Rugosus pubis García, 2001

References

Dytiscidae genera